Yên Bái is a city in Vietnam. It is the capital of Yên Bái Province, in the north-east region of Vietnam. The city borders Yên Bình District and Trấn Yên District. The city is a settlement along the banks of the Red River, approximately 183 km northwest of Hanoi. It is one of the important trading hubs between the highlands and the lowlands of Northern Vietnam.

History
At the end of the sixteenth century Yên Bái was a small village in Bach Lam district, Quy Hoa district, Hung Hoa province. On April 11, 1900, Yen Bai province was established by the French colonialist government. The city grew in size with the opening of the Hanoi–Lào Cai railway, which attracted many migrants.

On February 10, 1930, part of the 4th Regiment of Tonkinese Rifles stationed at Yen Bai mutinied against their French officers in the Yên Bái mutiny. They were suppressed by loyal troops from the same unit. This incident led to widespread disturbances against French rule across northeastern Vietnam during 1930–31.

Demographics
As of 2019, the city had a population of 100,631, covering an area of 108.15 km2 .

Administrative divisions 
Yên Bái administers 9 wards and 6 rural communes:

 Đồng Tâm
 Hồng Hà
 Hợp Minh
 Minh Tân
 Nam Cường
 Nguyễn Phúc
 Nguyễn Thái Học
 Yên Ninh
 Yên Thịnh

Rural communes:

 Âu Lâu
 Giới Phiên
 Minh Bảo
 Tân Thịnh
 Tuy Lộc
 Văn Phú

Climate

References

Populated places in Yên Bái province
Provincial capitals in Vietnam
Districts of Yên Bái province
Cities in Vietnam
Yên Bái province